was a Japanese actress. She was also famous as a member of the pop group Candies. While a member of Candies, Tanaka was known by the nickname . Still at the height of its popularity, the group disbanded in 1978. Tanaka was also the sister-in-law of the well-known actress Masako Natsume.

Tanaka was born in Adachi, Tokyo. She had a role in Godzilla vs. Biollante, portraying Asuka Okouchi. She won the Best Actress Award at the 14th Hochi Film Award for Black Rain.

In 1991, she married businessman Kazuo Odate. She was diagnosed with breast cancer in 1992. In October 2010, her cancer returned. Tanaka died on April 21, 2011 at the age of 55.

Filmography

Film
 Godzilla vs. Biollante (1989) – Asuka Okouchi
 Black Rain (1989) – Yasuko

Television
 Totsugeki! Hyūman!! (1972, NTV, Tokusatsu Series) - Hoshiyama Rumiko
 Oshin (1983, NHK) - Hatsuko age 20-40
 Tokugawa Ieyasu (1983, NHK) – Ayame
 Byakkotai (1986, NTV) - Yamamoto Yaeko
 Platonic Sex (2001, Fuji TV) – Kana's mother

Discography

Singles

 Cabochard (カボシャール)
 Tsumi TO ME (罪 TO ME)
 Gozen 5 Toki No DREAM (午前5時のドリーム)
 Feel My Love Inside

Albums

 Yoshiko (好子, 1984)

See also
Miki Fujimura, (a member of Candies)
Ran Ito, (a member of Candies)
Oshin, (Hatsuko)

References

External links
Official website 

1956 births
2011 deaths
Japanese idols
People from Adachi, Tokyo
Deaths from breast cancer
Deaths from cancer in Japan
Japanese women singers
Japanese actresses
Singers from Tokyo
20th-century Japanese musicians
20th-century women musicians